Myotubularin-related protein 5 is a protein that in humans is encoded by the SBF1 gene.

Interactions 

SBF1 has been shown to interact with MTMR2 and SUV39H1.

References

Further reading

External links